Angel wing is a syndrome that affects aquatic birds in which the wing feathers pointing out laterally, instead of lying against the body.

Angel wing or Angel wings may also refer to:
 Angel Wing (Glacier National Park), a mountain in Montana, US
 Angel wings, a fried dough pastry from northern Central Europe
 Angel wing begonia
 Pholadidae or angelwings, a family of bivalve mollusk similar to a clam
 Caladium or angel wings, a genus of flowering plants
 Opuntia microdasys, a species of cactus
 Pleurocybella porrigens, a wood-decay fungus
 Senecio candicans, an ornamental plant commonly known as 'angel wings'
 An element in the iconography of angels
 "Angel's Wings", a song by Westlife from Coast to Coast (Westlife album)
 Angel Wings (album), a 2013 album by Rainie Yang
 Angel Wings (TV series), a 2016 television series